Fifth-seeded pair Steffi Graf and Gabriela Sabatini claimed the title by defeating Gigi Fernández and Robin White in the final.

Seeds
A champion seed is indicated in bold text while text in italics indicates the round in which that seed was eliminated.

Draw

Finals

Top half

Bottom half

References

External links

U.S. Clay Court Championships
Women's Doubles